Bryoria fuscescens is a species of lichen of the family Parmeliaceae.

As of July 2021, its conservation status has not been estimated by the IUCN. In Iceland, where it grows as an epiphyte on downy birch stems and branches, it is classified as a vulnerable species (VU).

References

fuscescens
Lichen species
Lichens described in 1977
Taxa named by Vilmos Kőfaragó-Gyelnik